Bailuquan is a township under the administration of Luquan District of Shijiazhuang in southwestern Hebei province, China.

Administrative divisions
The township contains the following villages:

Dongtumen Village 	
Xitumen Village 	
Qiezhuang Village 	
Zaolin Village 	
Caofang Village 	
Bailuquan Village 	
Donghushen Village 	
Xihushen Village	()
Gujiayu Village 	
Xixuezhuang Village 	
Xiyangzhuang Village 	
Duanzhuang Village
Shuiyu Village 	
Shangniezhuang Village 	
Helianyu Village	() 	
Wuzhuang Village 	
Liangzhuang Village

See also
List of township-level divisions of Hebei

References

Township-level divisions of Hebei